Ferrán Marín Ramos (born 1974 in Tarragona) is a Spanish writer in Aragonese, Catalan and Spanish.

He has spent most of his life in Constantí. He studied Social work. He's a member of the Reial Societat Arqueológica Tarraconense, the Consello d'a Fabla Aragonesa and the Kataluna Esperanto Asocio. He was a publisher in O Limaco Edizions, a virtual publishing of free e-books.

Works 
Historia del pío hospital de pobres de Constantí, 1995.
Aportaciones al estudio arquitectónico de la ermita de Sant Llorenç i Santa Llúcia, 1997.
Gastó de Constantí, 1998.
Fabla!, 2000.
Lorién de Borbuén, 2003.
L'Arca d'as Tres Claus, 2008
Guía rápida de uso de yWriter5, 2009
Guía rápida de uso de yWriter5, 2014
La Mora Encantada, 2014

References

Spanish male writers
1974 births
Living people